Elvis is the eighteenth studio album by American singer and musician Elvis Presley, released on July 16, 1973. It sold over 1 million copies worldwide. To differentiate it from his eponymous 1956 release it is sometimes called The "Fool" Album, after its first track which appears just below Elvis' name on the front cover. In the US, "Fool" was issued as the B-side of "Steamroller Blues" from the Aloha from Hawaii Via Satellite album. In the UK the sides were flipped and "Fool" was issued as the A-side. It reached No. 15.

Content
The album tracks "Fool" and "Where Do I Go From Here" were recorded in March 1972. "It's Impossible" is a live recording from the Hilton Hotel in Las Vegas from February 1972, recorded during a successful fifty-seven show season. The remaining tracks were leftovers from the March and May 1971 recording sessions at RCA's Studio B in Nashville. Three songs feature Presley on piano:  "It's Still Here", "I'll Take You Home Again, Kathleen" and "I Will Be True". These three selections were all released together for a second time as part of the 1980 boxed set, Elvis Aron Presley. The song "Fool" was also released in this collection. Four other songs in this album were also reissued in other albums: "It's Impossible" (Pure Gold, 1975), "Padre" (He Walks Beside Me, 1978), "(That's What You Get) For Lovin' Me" (A Canadian Tribute, 1978) and "Don't Think Twice, It's All Right" (Our Memories Of Elvis Volume 2, 1979).

Track listing

Original LP release

Follow That Dream CD reissue
After more than 20 years of being out-of-print on vinyl, RCA reissued this album in March 1994 on the CD format, and again in 2010 on the Follow that Dream collectors label.

Personnel

Elvis Presley – lead vocals, piano
James Burton – lead guitar
The Sweet Inspirations – backing vocals on "It's Impossible"
The Nashville Edition - backing vocals on "(That's What You Get) For Lovin' Me"
Joe Babcock – backing vocals
Kenneth A. Buttrey – drums
Jerry Carrigan – drums
Chip Young – rhythm guitar
Glen D. Hardin – piano, string arrangements
Dolores Edgin – backing vocals
Joe Esposito – guitar, percussion

Emory Gordy Jr. – bass on "Fool" and "Where Do I Go From Here?"
Charlie Hodge – rhythm guitar
Ginger Holladay – backing vocals
The Imperials Quartet – backing vocals
Millie Kirkham – backing vocals
June Page – backing vocals
Norbert Putnam – bass
Temple Riser – backing vocals
Jerry Scheff – bass on "It's Impossible"

J. D. Sumner – vocals
Ron Tutt – drums
Hurshel Wiginton – backing vocals
John Wilkinson – rhythm guitar on "Fool," "Where Do I Go From Here?" and "It's Impossible"
Mary Holliday – backing vocals
Kathy Westmoreland – backing vocals on "It's Impossible"
Charlie McCoy – harmonica
Joe Guercio – conductor on "It's Impossible"
David Briggs – piano

References

External links

APL1-0283 Elvis Guide part of The Elvis Presley Record Research Database

Elvis Presley albums
Albums produced by Felton Jarvis
1973 albums
RCA Records albums